Bealiah (בְּעַלְיָה beh-al-yaw) or Baalyah, a Benjamite, was one of David's thirty heroes who went to Ziklag, mentioned in . The name derives from Baal and Jah, and according to the International Standard Bible Encyclopedia (1915) means "Yahweh is Lord."

References

Biblical figures in rabbinic literature
Year of birth unknown
Year of death unknown